Jacob Shaw may refer to:

 Jacob Shaw (musician) (born 1988), classical cellist
 Jacob Shaw (comics), a fictional character in Marvel Comics